Musscher or van Musscher is a Dutch surname that may refer to
Jacob van Musscher (1580–1623), Dutch painter
Michiel van Musscher (1645–1705), Dutch painter
Johannes Hendricus van Musscher (1924–1989), Dutch singer known as Johnny Jordaan
Steef van Musscher (1902–1986), Dutch Olympic triple jumper

Dutch-language surnames